The Queen's Award for Enterprise: Sustainable Development (International Trade Export) (2014) was awarded on 21 April 2014, by Queen Elizabeth II.

The following organisations were awarded this year:

Recipients

A-E

F-M

N-Z

References

2014 awards in the United Kingdom
Queen's Award for Enterprise: International Trade (Export)